Anastasiopolis or Anastasioupolis ("city of Anastasios"), is the name given several ancient cities founded or rebuilt by Roman emperors named Anastasius:

In modern Turkey
 Dara (Mesopotamia) in the Roman province of Mesopotamia, in modern Mardin Province, Turkey
 Anastasiopolis in Galatia, modern Beypazarı, Asian Turkey
 Anastasiopolis (Phrygia), a city in Phrygia, near Laodicea on the Lycus
 Telmessos, modern Fethiye, Turkey

Elsewhere
 Anastasioupolis-Peritheorion, a former town near Amaxades, Thrace, Greece
 Resafa, Syria, also known as Sergiopolis